The Gibbs-Thomas House, at 137 NW Temple St. in Salt Lake City, Utah, was built in 1896.  It was listed on the National Register of Historic Places in 1984.

It was designed by architect Richard K. A. Kletting in Queen Anne style.

It was inherited by Elbert D. Thomas, a U.S. Senator for Utah from 1932 to 1950, and was his only residence in Utah.

References

National Register of Historic Places in Salt Lake City
Queen Anne architecture in Utah
Houses completed in 1896